Ibiza Classics is a compilation album by Pete Tong with Jules Buckley and the Heritage Orchestra. The follow-up to Classic House (2016), it was released through Universal Music on 1 December 2017. It has sold 97,663 copies as of March 2018.

Track listing
"Clubbed to Death"
"Galvanize"
"Body Language"
"Killer"
"Sing It Back"
"You Don't Know Me"
"Running/Finally"
"Unfinished Sympathy"
"Rej/Man with the Red Face/Yeke Yeke"
"La Ritournelle"
"Promised Land"
"Grey"
"Out of Space"
"One"
"You Got the Love"

Charts and certifications

Weekly charts

Certifications

See also
 List of UK Dance Albums Chart number ones of 2017
 List of UK Dance Albums Chart number ones of 2018

References

2017 compilation albums
Universal Music Group compilation albums